In enzymology, an estradiol 17beta-dehydrogenase is an enzyme that catalyzes the chemical reaction

estradiol-17beta + NAD(P)+  estrone + NAD(P)H + H+

The 3 substrates of this enzyme are estradiol-17beta, NAD+, and NADP+, whereas its 4 products are estrone, NADH, NADPH, and H+.

This enzyme belongs to the family of oxidoreductases, specifically those acting on the CH-OH group of donor with NAD+ or NADP+ as acceptor. The systematic name of this enzyme class is estradiol-17beta:NAD(P)+ 17-oxidoreductase. Other names in common use include 20alpha-hydroxysteroid dehydrogenase, 17beta,20alpha-hydroxysteroid dehydrogenase, 17beta-estradiol dehydrogenase, estradiol dehydrogenase, estrogen 17-oxidoreductase, and 17beta-HSD. This enzyme participates in androgen and estrogen metabolism.

Structural studies

References

 
 

EC 1.1.1
NADPH-dependent enzymes
NADH-dependent enzymes
Enzymes of known structure